Very Silly Songs refer to:

 "Very Silly Songs", a Kidsongs 1991 video
 "Very Silly Songs", a VeggieTales 1999 video